The New York Magpies is a United States Australian Football League team, based in New York City, United States. It was founded in 1998 by an American, Erik Kallhovd. They play in the Eastern Australian Football League. The New York Magpies play their home games at Tibbetts Brook Park.

History
The New York team became known as the Magpies, when American expatriate and then club historian of the Collingwood Football Club, Richard Stremski, furnished the fledgling club with footballs and guernseys and have been an affiliate of Collingwood ever since. The club also has a connection with the  Magpies in the SANFL where some New York players have enjoyed scholarships to play with the club.

About half of the players of the New York Magpies team are Australian.

The New York Magpies won the Men's Division 1 & 4 USAFL National Championships Grand Final in 2010 and Division 1 in 2014.

Honour Board

See also

References

External links
 

Sports clubs established in 1998
1998 establishments in New York (state)
Australian rules football clubs in the United States
Sports teams in New York City
Collingwood Football Club
Sports in the Bronx